Yujiangolepis is a genus of basal arthrodire placoderms related to Antarctaspis. The type species is Y. liujingensis, described from the  Nakaoling or Nagaoling Formation of Hengxian, Guangxi.

References 

Arthrodires
Pragian life
Placoderms of Asia
Devonian China
Fossils of China
Paleontology in Guangxi
Fossil taxa described in 2009